The Co-Cathedral of St. John the Evangelist is a cathedral of the Catholic Church in Rochester, Minnesota, United States. It is the co-cathedral and a parish church of the Diocese of Winona-Rochester.

History
St. John the Evangelist Parish was established by the Rev. James Morris in 1863. It is the oldest Catholic parish in Rochester. At the time of its founding, the property where the parish's buildings continue to stand was acquired. A church was completed in 1872 and dedicated by Bishop Thomas Grace of St. Paul. As the parish grew, a larger church building was completed in 1905. Three schools, a grade school, a girl's high school and a boy's high school opened in 1913. Plans for the present church were completed by New Ulm architect Edward F. Wirtz, and construction began in 1955. Local contractors completed construction two years later. The Modern structure features an exterior composed of Mankato stone and a seating capacity of 1,200. It was extensively renovated from 2001 to 2002.

On March 27, 2018, Pope Francis elevated the church to be the co-cathedral of the newly renamed Diocese of Winona-Rochester. The new designation reflects the economic growth of the city of Rochester, and the demographic changes that have occurred since the diocese was founded in 1889. Three-quarters of the diocese's population now resides between Rochester and Mankato. St. John the Evangelist Church was elevated to cathedral status at a liturgy on June 24, 2018, the Nativity of Saint John the Baptist.

See also
List of Catholic cathedrals in the United States
List of cathedrals in the United States

References

External links

 
 Diocese of Winona-Rochester website

Religious organizations established in 1863
Roman Catholic churches completed in 1957
20th-century Roman Catholic church buildings in the United States
Modernist architecture in Minnesota
Roman Catholic cathedrals in Minnesota
Buildings and structures in Rochester, Minnesota
Churches in the Roman Catholic Diocese of Winona-Rochester